James Henry Jones (December 30, 1918, Memphis, Tennessee – April 29, 1982, Burbank, California) was an American jazz pianist and arranger.

Biography
As a child, Jones learned guitar and piano. He worked in Chicago orchestras from 1936 and played in a trio with Stuff Smith from 1943 to 1945. Following this, he played with Don Byas, Dizzy Gillespie (1945), J.C. Heard (1945–47), Buck Clayton (1946) and Etta Jones. He accompanied Sarah Vaughan from 1947 to 1952, and then again from 1954 to 1958 after a long illness. In 1954, he played on an album with Clifford Brown and accompanied him on his European tour. Around this time, he also played with Helen Merrill and Gil Evans. In 1959, he accompanied Anita O'Day in her appearance at the Newport Jazz Festival and worked with Dakota Staton, Pat Suzuki, and Morgana King.

As a pianist and arranger in New York City, he worked in the 1960s with Harry Belafonte, Johnny Hodges, Budd Johnson, Nat Gonella, and Clark Terry. He accompanied Chris Connor on her version of "Where Flamingoes Fly", and sat in with Duke Ellington's Orchestra for some collaborations with Ella Fitzgerald. Jones did a set with his trio (Jimmy Hughart and Grady Tate) at the Antibes Jazz Festival in 1966, and the following year toured with Jazz at the Philharmonic. In the 1970s, he worked with Kenny Burrell and Cannonball Adderley.

In the course of his career, Jones played piano on recordings by Harry Sweets Edison, Ben Webster, Big Joe Turner, Coleman Hawkins, Frank Wess, Milt Jackson, Sidney Bechet, Sonny Rollins, Sonny Stitt, and Thad Jones and worked as an arranger for Wes Montgomery, Nancy Wilson, Sandler and Young, Shirley Horn, Joe Williams, Billy Taylor, and Chris Connor.

Dave Brubeck cited Jones as an influence and said of him: "He didn't like to solo. Harmonically, though, he was one of the greatest players I ever heard."

Discography

As leader
 "Jimmy Jones'  Big Eight": Rex Stewart And the Ellingtonians (Riverside, OJC, 1946) with Harry Carney, Lawrence Brown, Otto Hardwick, Ted Nash, Billy Taylor, Shelly Manne
 "Jimmy Jones'  Big Four": Giants of Small Band Swing, Vol. 1 & 2 (Riverside, OJC, 1946) with Budd Johnson, Al Hall, Denzil Best

As sideman
With Kenny Burrell
Ellington Is Forever (Fantasy, 1975)
Ellington Is Forever Volume Two (Fantasy, 1975)
With Buck Clayton
How Hi the Fi (Columbia, 1954)
Buck Meets Ruby (Vanguard, 1954) with Ruby Braff
Jumpin' at the Woodside (Columbia, 1955)
With Harry Edison
The Swinger (Verve, 1958)
 Mr. Swing (Verve, 1958 [1960])
Harry Edison Swings Buck Clayton (Verve, 1958) with Buck Clayton
With Johnny Griffin
White Gardenia (Riverside, 1961)
With Johnny Hodges
Blue Pyramid (Verve, 1966) with Wild Bill Davis
Blue Notes (Verve, 1966) as arranger and conductor
Triple Play (RCA Victor, 1967) as performer and arranger
With Illinois Jacquet
Swing's the Thing (Clef, 1956)
With Budd Johnson
Budd Johnson and the Four Brass Giants (Riverside, 1960)
With Thad Jones
The Jones Boys (Period, 1957) with Eddie Jones, Quincy Jones and Jo Jones
With Helen Merrill
Helen Merrill (Em Arcy, 1955) Produced by Quincy Jones
You've Got a Date with the Blues (MetroJazz, 1959), as performer and arranger
With Joe Newman 
Joe Newman with Woodwinds (Roulette, 1958)
With Paul Quinichette
Moods (EmArcy, 1954)
With Sonny Stitt
New York Jazz (Verve, 1956)
The Saxophones of Sonny Stitt (Roost, 1958)
A Little Bit of Stitt (Roost, 1959)
The Sonny Side of Stitt (Roost, 1959)
Stittsville (Roost, 1960)
Sonny Side Up (Roost, 1960)
Stitt in Orbit (Roost, 1960 [1963])
With Clark Terry
Top and Bottom Brass (Riverside, 1959)
With Ben Webster
The Soul of Ben Webster (Verve, 1958)
Ben Webster and Associates (Verve, 1959)
With Sarah Vaughan
Sarah Vaughan with Clifford Brown (Em Arcy, 1955)
In the Land of Hi-Fi (EmArcy, 1955)
Swingin' Easy (EmArcy, 1957, tracks 3, 5, 6, 9, and 13)
At Mister Kelly's (EmArcy, 1957)
With Nancy Wilson
The Sound of Nancy Wilson (Capitol, 1968)
Hurt So Bad (Capitol, 1969)

As arranger
With Johnny Hodges
 Don't Sleep in the Subway (Verve, 1967)
With Milt Jackson
The Ballad Artistry of Milt Jackson (Atlantic, 1959)
For Someone I Love (Riverside, 1963)
Feelings (Pablo, 1976)
With Billy Taylor
Kwamina (Mercury, 1961)
With Nancy Wilson
Easy (Capitol, 1968)
Nancy (Capitol, 1969)
With Sandler and Young
Pretty Things Come in Twos (Sandler & Young Album)(Capitol)
Honey Come Back (Sandler & Young album) (Capitol)
Odds and Ends (Sandler & Young album) (Capitol)

References

1918 births
1982 deaths
American jazz pianists
American male pianists
20th-century American pianists
Jazz musicians from Tennessee
20th-century American male musicians
American male jazz musicians